Gornja Trnava may refer to:

 Gornja Trnava (Topola), a village near Topola, Serbia 
 Gornja Trnava (Niš), a village near Niš, Serbia 
 Gornja Trnava (Prokuplje), a village near Prokuplje, Serbia